Blue Interlude is an album by the Wynton Marsalis Septet, released in 1992 by Columbia Records.

Track listing 
All songs composed by Wynton Marsalis except where noted
"Brother Veal"
"Monologue for Sugar Cane and Sweetie Pie"
"Blue Interlude"
"And the Band Played On" (Wycliffe Gordon, Marsalis)
"The Jubilee Suite" (Todd Williams, Marsalis)
"Sometimes It Goes Like That"

Personnel 
 Wynton Marsalis – trumpet; piano and spoken word (2)
 Reginald Veal – bass
 Herlin Riley – drums
 Marcus Roberts – piano
 Wessel Anderson – alto saxophone
 Todd Williams – tenor saxophone, soprano saxophone, clarinet
 Wycliffe Gordon – trombone

References

1992 albums
Wynton Marsalis albums
Columbia Records albums